Isaiah Israel Broussard (born August 22, 1994) is an American actor. He made his film debut in the comedy-drama Flipped, and is known for his roles in the crime film The Bling Ring (2013), the drama Perfect High (2015), the thriller H8RZ (2015), the comedy Good Kids (2016), the slasher film Happy Death Day (2017) as well as its 2019 sequel Happy Death Day 2U, and the teen romance film To All the Boys I've Loved Before (2018).

Early life
Isaiah Israel Adams was born in Gulfport, Mississippi, to Angela (née Clapp), a Mary Kay cosmetics consultant, and Lawrence Clayton Adams (1957–1999), who died when Broussard was four. He was raised in Saucier, Mississippi by his mother and stepfather, Gil Broussard, a computer programmer, who later adopted him and his older sister. He has one younger half-brother from his mother's remarriage.

Career
Broussard began his career with small roles as Garrett Einbinder in the comedy-drama Flipped (2010) and Josh in the comedy The Chaperone (2011), before landing the role of Marc Hall in Sofia Coppola's crime film The Bling Ring (2013). He earned praise for his performance in the latter, which was based on the real-life group of teenage burglars, the Bling Ring.

In 2013, Broussard appeared alongside Lily Collins in the music video for M83's "Claudia Lewis", directed by Bryce Dallas Howard. He then portrayed Carson Taft in the Lifetime film Perfect High (2015). The following year, Broussard starred as Mike "Spice" Jennings in the comedy film Good Kids.

Broussard starred as Carter Davis, opposite Jessica Rothe, in Christopher Landon's slasher film Happy Death Day (2017). In 2018, he had a leading role in the alien invasion thriller Extinction, and played Josh Sanderson in the film adaptation of Jenny Han's young adult romance novel To All the Boys I've Loved Before, the latter directed by Susan Johnson. Broussard then reprised his role as Carter Davis in the 2019 sequel Happy Death Day 2U.

Controversial comments
On August 21, 2018, days after the release of To All the Boys I've Loved Before, a collection of tweets by Broussard resurfaced that were deemed insensitive and racist by commentators, including on the subject of the Black Lives Matter movement. For instance, after the 2011 Tōhoku earthquake and tsunami, Broussard tweeted: "Dogs can sense earthquakes. Too bad Japan ate them all." In addition, he was also found to have liked tweets promoting Sandy Hook conspiracy theories and anti-Muslim tweets. He released an apology on Twitter, stating, "I am dedicated to becoming a more informed and educated version of myself."

Filmography

Film

Television

Music videos

References

External links
 

1994 births
21st-century American male actors
American adoptees
American male child actors
American male film actors
American male television actors
Living people
Male actors from Mississippi
People from Gulfport, Mississippi